Elizabeth Marsh (1735–1785) was an Englishwoman who was held captive in Morocco for a brief period after the ship she was traveling from Gibraltar to England to unite with her fiancé was intercepted by a Moroccan corsair and overtaken by its crew. Marsh revealed the experiences of her captivity through her captive narrative,The Female Captive: A Narrative of Fact Which Happened in Barbary in the Year 1756, Written by Herself, published more than a decade after her return from captivity. The Female Captive documents Marsh's misfortunes after she and her shipmates were captured by Moroccan sailors, becoming the first captive barbary narrative written in English by a woman author. In the published version, Marsh also added quite a few details that helped reframe her narrative in a more novelistic form and that heightened the sense of danger she felt as well as created dramatic tension around the question of whether or not she would escape. Marsh's narrative is an important contributor to the larger genre of European women's captivity narratives, which frequently featured female resistance to captivity and sexual violence.

Captivity 
Marsh moved to Gibraltar to board a ship on July 28, 1756, Marsh was meant to take this passage to join her fiancé back home and marry him. After the Ann was ‘unhappily deserted’ by the Gosport, it was easily taken on August 8 by a Moroccan corsair of about 20 guns and 130 seamen, then carried to Salé. The captives were “conducted” to Marrakech and Marsh started to hate the idea of being sexually harassed. Marsh had decided to disguise herself as the wife of a Mr. James Crisp, a merchant from London in her narrative of the story. But he is actually the ship's captain in the letters he sent out. After being presented to the Prince Sidi Mohammed, everything went down hill for Marsh. She was importuned to be the Prince's concubine, tricked into renouncing her Christianity and converting to Islam, and almost beat in submission. But after four months and resumed peace talks with Morocco, Marsh gained her coveted liberty and returned home.

Manipulation as a survival tactic of female slave captives 
Marsh doesn't often show how she feels in her captive narrative, The Female Captive, about what is happening to her at the time she is being held captive. However, she does make sure to show the very little interest that she has in doing anything that the Prince Sidi Mohammed asks her to do; she continuously says she would prefer death to doing anything for him that has any forms of sexual favors being asked. Although, people judge her for using manipulation in her narrative, even if she did happen to use them for her own survival. Marsh uses the powerful dependent tactic, the constant victim tactic, and the multiple offender tactic to help her in surviving this captive life she is currently living. In The Female Captive it is said, "Despairing of cowing his hostage into submission, the Prince grudgingly granted her freedom and permission to leave the country, yet not before Britain formally agreed to resume peace talks with Morocco." Upon looking into this statement, we see the powerful dependent tactic coming into play. Reading into the rest of the narrative, you are given more than enough examples of Marsh using manipulation for her own survival.

Despite Marsh's position as an enslaved woman, she still holds power over her fellow white male captives, since whenever she desires an accommodation, she receives one. Marsh's narrative is marked by her ability to evade the humiliating conditions and hard labor the male captives endured and, rather, how she was treated with care, and leisurely made her way through her time spent as a captive. Marsh had a dichotomous, paradoxical enslavement, in that she was technically a captive, yet was not enslaved the way the men were. She was never given duties quite as harsh as the men, and could skew a situation in her favor by highlighting the fact that she's a woman. Marsh's complaints throughout the narrative can be read as reminders to those around her that she knew how she would be treated, thus implying that Marsh understood her placement in the hierarchy of power among captives and used it to her advantage. When she needed the passivity to work in her favor, she did so to remain innocent and chaste, and when she needed the agency to get what she wanted, she did so in defiance and entitlement. Contrary to the males, female captives seemed to find themselves given a chance to travel, self-reliance and assertiveness, and non-domestic work opportunities. The Female Captive: A Narrative of Facts which Happened in Barbary in the Year 1756, Written by Herself is a testament to how women in captivity narratives, particularly Elizabeth Marsh, uses their femininity and sexuality to their benefit in order to bypass situations and pad their position, and in doing so, provides an alternative lens on the traditional, male slave tales.

Concubinage 
Slavery was a part of Arab culture before the Qur’an. It was a part of society that contributed to the financial stability and day-to-day lives of many people throughout the Arab world.  While slavery was an accepted practice from the beginning, the idea of concubines was based more on individual interpretations of the Qur'an.   Only slaves could become concubines, which opened the door to the practice of enslaving women from other cultures for that purpose.  While popular culture spread the idea of the harem to the Western world, the practice was largely confined to the wealthy.  The practicalities of taking care of a large number of women were too much for the everyday man of the time to even consider.  The term harem referred not only to wives and concubines, but all other female members of the household, including children and domestic slaves.   Screened from male view, the harem became a source of mystery and rumor for Europeans.  This was enhanced due to the fact that male writers, many of whom purported to have knowledge of the harem, gave hugely exaggerated accounts.  For example, Thomas Pellow, who was enslaved for 23 years in Morocco, claimed that the harem of Moulay Ismail had eight thousand wives living in it.  While European narratives about harems were largely exaggerated accounts given by men who had no access to them, evidence exists that points to abuse, poisonings, and women being sold when they started aging or their appearance started to decline.

Life after captivity 
Elizabeth Marsh faced scrutiny after returning home after her captivity. She stated within the author's note of The Female Captive that “Though I have unhappily seldom experienced those Hours [of Ease and Tranquility], who may say, with too much Truth, that the Misfortunes I met with in Barbary have been more equalled by those I have since experienced, in this Land of Civil and Religious Liberty." Upon her return, suspicion arose regarding the maintenance of her chastity while in captivity due to her many visits with the sultan. At the time, influential members of European society believed that women could be easily persuaded to undertake various actions thanks to the exotic allure of the Orient; these ideas were encouraged by the publication of a translated version of The Arabian Nights by French orientalist Antoine Galland (an English version of the book was first published in 1795, although French copies were available to Marsh).

Problems with publishing 
Even though almost two-thirds of all slaves brought into the Islamic world were female, women captive narratives were scrutinized more than captive narratives written by men. The argument against the legitimacy of captive narratives by women was rooted in the presumably-inherent feminine weakness that was believed to prevent women from resisting the opulence of the Orient. Elizabeth Marsh faced this same criticism when she returned home, preventing her from publishing her narrative due to fear of the backlash it would cause. Even with her aforementioned display of strength when faced with Sultan Sidi Mohammad Ben Abdallah's offer of concubinage, Elizabeth was accused of being a liar and giving up her virtue to him.

Post-traumatic stress disorder 
Elizabeth Marsh displayed multiple parts of what defines symptoms of post-traumatic stress disorder. She exhibited symptoms of loneliness, emotional detachment from herself and those around her, and distrust. Along with these symptoms, the fact that she felt the need to narrate her story was a way for Marsh to digest what had happened to her and how to cope with it all, even if she was pressured into writing about it.

Post-traumatic stress disorder is a key part of understanding why Marsh focused on writing what she wrote about. Some critics of these slave narratives claim that what she wrote was not, in fact, the truth. It was her truth and that, if it was manipulated, it was by the post-traumatic stress disorder that she was focusing on handling without even being aware it was happening to her brain. The awareness of mental disorders and disease is a new area of health that has only recently started to come to light in the past ten years. So, for a woman to branch out and write about her traumatic experiences was a mark of how brave she was and also how confused.

Impact of captivity 
After her time in captivity, Elizabeth Marsh went on to marry James Crisp, the man that she pretended to be married to while a slave. By pretending to be married to Crisp Marsh had hoped that she would not be assaulted by the several other men that she was traveling with. She succeeded in this, however her validity for a real marriage was called into question after her release. After insistence from her parents, Marsh married Crisp and went on to have two children with him. By creating this false narrative while in captivity, Marsh's life took a different turn than what was planned.

Marsh's later life then took a turn when she decided to be away from her family for 18 months, choosing to be more independent in that time. It could be argued that Marsh did this as a result of her time in captivity and was making an attempt to live life that she lost.

Arguably the largest impact that Elizabeth Marsh's captivity had on herself was the production and publication of her narrative. Though it was originally published anonymously, word traveled that Marsh was the author. By publishing her experiences in captivity, Elizabeth Marsh's narrative became one of the most consumed female slavery narratives as well as one of the few to withstand time.

References

Additional Reading 
 
 
 www.jjhc.info Family history website showing links to relatives

1735 births
1785 deaths
Barbary Wars
18th-century English women
18th-century English people
18th-century British women writers
18th-century English non-fiction writers
English diarists
Moroccan slaves
18th-century slaves
Women memoirists
People who wrote slave narratives
18th-century diarists